The Self-Master Colony (1908–1938) was an experiment in housing the homeless in Union Township, Union County, New Jersey. A lengthy article about it was published in the December 9, 1911, issue of Literary Digest magazine.

History

The colony was built on the Hoyt family mansion in Union Township, Union County, New Jersey, in 1908. The colony was founded by Andress Small Floyd and his wife Lillian.

References

External links

1908 establishments in New Jersey
Union Township, Union County, New Jersey
Homelessness in the United States
Homelessness charities
Housing in New Jersey